Piyapong Pue-on born: Padej Khankruea (November 14, 1959) is a Thai retired football player who played as a striker. He was a member of the Thailand national team and also played for South Korean side Lucky-Goldstar FC.

Club career

Lucky-Goldstar FC

In August 1984, Piyapong joined K League club Lucky-Goldstar FC.

In the 1984 K League season, he scored on his debut on 8 September against POSCO Dolphins. He played one of the leading roles to crown the Lucky-Goldstar as the K League champions in 1985, scoring 12 goals and providing 6 assists.

International career
Piyapong played for Thailand national team for 16 years (1981–1997), scoring 70 goals in 100 appearances in full international matches.

International goals 
Results list Thailand's goal tally first.

Coaching career
Piyapong coached the Royal Thai Air Force football club between 1997 and 2008.

Personal life
Piyapong appeared in the 2004 film Born to Fight.

Honours

Player
Lucky-Goldstar FC
 K League (1): 1985

Individual
 K League Top Scorer Award (1): 1985
 K League Top Assists Award (1): 1985
 K League Best XI (1): 1985

Manager
Royal Thai Air Force
 Thai Premier League (2): 1997, 1999

Individual
Asian Player of the Month: February 1997
Asian Coach of the Month: January 1998

See also
 List of men's footballers with 100 or more international caps

References

External links
 
 

1959 births
Living people
Piyapong Pue-on
Association football forwards
Piyapong Pue-on
Piyapong Pue-on
Piyapong Pue-on
K League 1 players
FC Seoul players
Sri Pahang FC players
Thai expatriate footballers
Expatriate footballers in South Korea
Expatriate footballers in Malaysia
Thai expatriate sportspeople in South Korea
Thai expatriate sportspeople in Malaysia
Piyapong Pue-on
Footballers at the 1986 Asian Games
Footballers at the 1982 Asian Games
Piyapong Pue-on
Piyapong Pue-on
Southeast Asian Games medalists in football
Competitors at the 1981 Southeast Asian Games
Competitors at the 1983 Southeast Asian Games
Competitors at the 1985 Southeast Asian Games
Competitors at the 1987 Southeast Asian Games
Competitors at the 1989 Southeast Asian Games
Competitors at the 1993 Southeast Asian Games
Competitors at the 1997 Southeast Asian Games
Piyapong Pue-on